The Secret Sisters is a 2010 album by American country music duo the Secret Sisters. Produced by Dave Cobb and T Bone Burnett, the album consists of ballads, originals, and cover songs such as "Why Don't You Love Me", "Why Baby Why", and the Frank Sinatra song "Somethin' Stupid". The album also includes two originals written by Laura Rogers: "Tennessee Me" and "Waste the Day".  Also included is a cover of the 1960s rock song by then-teenage singer Nancy Baron, "I've Got a Feeling", written by Wally Zober and C. Laverne.

Production
The album was recorded in two weeks at Blackbird Studios. Steel guitar player Robbie Turner and pianist Pig Robbins also performed on the album. The album was recorded on analog equipment without computers or digital equipment, the way it would have been done in the 1950s. The production team and the Sisters utilized vintage microphones and classic recording techniques, down to the same type of tape they would have used fifty years ago. Laura Rogers tried to describe the experience by expressing:

"In so many ways we are still the same kids who would perform songs in our parents' room, when we sang about silver threads and golden needles and cold-hearted snakes, and all that.  Even with everything that's happened -- getting that dream chance to make our own album, I really believe we've just found where we're supposed to be." 
 
The album was released on October 10, 2010. It peaked at 27 on the Billboard US Country Charts.

Track listing

Personnel

The Secret Sisters
Laura Rogers- vocals
Lydia Rogers- vocals

Additional Musicians
Brian Allen- bass guitar
Rob Arthur- piano
Dave Cobb- percussion
Jason "Rowdy" Cope- acoustic guitar, electric guitar
Russ Pahl- pedal steel guitar
Dean Parks- electric guitar
Chris Powell- drums
Hargus "Pig" Robbins- piano
Jackson Smith- acoustic guitar, electric guitar
Robby Turner- pedal steel guitar

Reception
The album received mostly positive reviews from critics. James Allen called the album "timeless-sounding", while Stephen Rowland of PopMatters gave the album 8 out of 10 stars. Rolling Stone gave the album 4 out of 5 stars and called it "boundless fun". On the other hand, Alexis Petridis of The Guardian criticized some songs on the album for being "unbearably twee".

Charts

References

External links
The Independent review

2010 debut albums
The Secret Sisters albums
Universal Republic Records albums
Albums produced by T Bone Burnett
Albums produced by Dave Cobb